Jonatan Leonel Acosta (born 11 October 1988) is an Argentinian professional footballer who plays as a midfielder for Hong Kong Premier League club Lee Man.

Career
On 10 January 2018, Acosta signed a one-year contract with PKNS.

On 16 February 2019, Acosta joined Hong Kong side Dreams.

On 19 July 2019, Lee Man announced the signing of Acosta.

References

External links 
 
 
 

Living people
1988 births
Association football midfielders
PKNS F.C. players
Malaysia Super League players
Argentine expatriate footballers
Argentine footballers
Expatriate footballers in Malaysia
Argentine expatriate sportspeople in Hong Kong
Expatriate footballers in Hong Kong
Hong Kong Premier League players
Dreams Sports Club players
Lee Man FC players
Argentine expatriate sportspeople in Malaysia
People from La Matanza Partido
Sportspeople from Buenos Aires Province